The 1957 Ukrainian Cup was a football knockout competition conducting by the Football Federation of the Ukrainian SSR and was known as the Ukrainian Cup.

Teams

Tournament distribution 
The competition was conducted among 23 clubs out of 80 participants of the 1957 Football Championship and 5 other non-"teams of masters" Chervonyi Prapor Lviv, Khimik Kalush, Spartak Bila Tserkva, Burevisnyk Chernivtsi, Naftovyk Drohobych.

Non-participating "teams of masters" 
The Ukrainian teams of masters did not take part in the competition.
 1957 Soviet Class A: FC Dynamo Kyiv, FC Shakhtar Stalino
 1957 Soviet Class B: FC Avanhard Kharkiv, FC Avanhard Mykolaiv, FC Khimik Dniprodzerzhynsk, FC Kolhospnyk Poltava, FC Metalurh Dnipropetrovsk, FC Metalurh Zaporizhia, FC Pischevik Odesa, FC Shakhtar Kadiivka, SKVO Lvov, SKVO Kiev, SKCF Sevastopol, FC Spartak Stanislav, FC Spartak Uzhhorod, FC Trudovi Rezervy Voroshylovhrad

Competition schedule

First elimination round

Second elimination round 
Byes: Torpedo Kharkiv, Lokomotyv Poltava, Burevisnyk Chernivtsi, Naftovyk Drohobych

Replay

Quarterfinals

Semifinals

Final 
The final was held in Kiev.

Top goalscorers

See also 
 Soviet Cup
 Ukrainian Cup

Notes

References

External links 
 Information source 
 The 1957 Cup of the UkrSSR (1957. Кубок УССР). Luhansk Our Football

1957
Cup
1957 domestic association football cups